Three Kings is the only studio album by R&B group TGT. The album was released on August 20, 2013 on Atlantic Records.

Commercial performance
The album debuted at number three on the Billboard 200 chart, with first-week sales of 76,000 copies in the United States.

Track listing

Sample credits
 "No Fun" contains a sample of "Ain't No Fun (If The Homies Can't Have None)", as performed by Snoop Dogg.
 "Explode" contains a sample of "I Wanna Rock", as performed by Luke.

Personnel
Credits adapted from Allmusic.

 Andrew Hey – guitars, recording engineer
 Agape Jerry – guitars
 Javad Day – keyboards
 Mansur Zafr – drum programming
 Ivan "Orthodox" Barias – drum programming
 Michael "Mike Jay" Jimenez – background vocals
 Harvey Mason, Jr. – keyboards, vocal production, mixing
 David Boyd – assistant engineer
 Michael Daley – drum programming, assistant engineer
 Richard Furch – recording engineer, mixing, editing
 Tyrese Gibson – primary artist, mixing, executive producer
 Ginuwine – primary artist, executive producer
 Tank – primary artist, producer, executive producer
 Trina Bowman – production coordinator
 Dave Kutch – mastering
 Marc Baptiste – photography
 Mark Obriski – art direction, design
 Mitchell "M.O." Owens – additional production

Charts

Weekly charts

Year-end charts

Release history

References

2013 debut albums
Atlantic Records albums
Albums produced by Tim & Bob
Albums produced by the Underdogs (production team)